Megistopus is a genus of antlions belonging to the family Myrmeleontidae.

The species of this genus are found in Southern Europe.

Species:

Megistopus flavicornis 
Megistopus lucasi

References

Myrmeleontidae